Discordance Axis was an American grindcore band from East Brunswick, New Jersey.

Biography 
Frontman Jon Chang stated on the history of the band:

"Discordance Axis was a three piece grindcore band that started in NJ around 1992. The band started after myself and Rob's previous band disintegrated and we found Dave at a Human Remains show. We asked him to play a split 7-inch with us and it snowballed from there.

The pattern was, we got together and wrote and recorded some material, then would part ways. We never really played live much because...well we couldn't manage to sell more than 500 copies of any of our records and we all had conflicting schedules.

We get asked why we only toured Japan. That's easy. That's where all our records sold. And most of the bands we liked were from over there.

Steve Procopio played live a lot with us and recorded the guitar tracks on the Necropolitan EP. Rob Marton plays guitar on every other recording we produced. Steve and Rob were two really gifted people and I feel fortunate to have played with both them and Dave.

There's a much more detailed band history in the Original Sound Version and Jouhou reissue CD's that Hydrahead released, but in brief, Discordance Axis started in 1992 and broke up in 2001. All of our music has been re-issued on CD except for our tracks on the Necropolitan EP(because the master is lost) and our track from the Snarl Out Vol 2 7-inch comp record.

Jon Chang now sings for Gridlink.
Rob Marton writes lots of music but isn't in a band.
Dave Witte plays for Municipal Waste (among others)."

Style 
In the beginning the band played straightforward grindcore influenced by the likes of Napalm Death, but on later releases they showcased a very original style. Robert Marton played guitar lines that were both technical and dissonant, and added creative overdubs to augment the melodies. Dave Witte added complex rolls, fills, and jarring rhythmic shifts to the usual barrage of blast beats found in grindcore. Jon Chang alternated between a shrill shriek and a "gastrointestinal" roar, and based most of his metaphorical lyrics on novels and anime. The band had no bassist and released the majority of their full-length recordings in DVD cases rather than CD cases coming with unusually large booklets (normally with liner notes for each song longer than the lyrics).

Members

Current members 
Jon Chang – vocals (Gridlink, Hayaino Daisuki, No One Knows What the Dead Think)
Rob Marton – guitar (No One Knows What the Dead Think)
Dave Witte – drums (Burnt by the Sun, Human Remains, Municipal Waste, Black Army Jacket, Melt-Banana, Exit-13, Deny the Cross, Hope Collapse, East West Blast Test, Birds of Prey, Phantomsmasher)

Former members 
Steve Procopio – guitar (1997–1998, 2001)
Rob Proctor – drums (1995)

Discography

Studio albums 
 Ulterior (1995), Devour Records/Pulp Records
 Jouhou (1997), Hydra Head Records
 The Inalienable Dreamless (2000), Hydra Head Records

EPs 
split with Cosmic Hurse (1992), Pulp Records
split with Hellchild (1993), HG Fact
split with Capitalist Casualties (1994), Pulp Records
split with Def Master (1994), HG Fact
split with Melt-Banana (1995), HG Fact
split with Plutocracy (1995), Slap a Ham Records
Necropolitan (1997), HG Fact
split with Corrupted and 324 (2001), HG Fact

Compilations 
 Original Sound Version 1992–1995 (1998), Devour Records
 The Inalienable Dreamless Perfect Version Box Set (2000), self-released
 Our Last Day (2005), Hydra Head Records

Videos 
 7.62mm (1997), self-released
 Pikadourei (2002), Hydra Head Records

External links 
Official website

Discordance Axis at MySpace
Interview with Dave Witte at Lambgoat.com

American grindcore musical groups
American musical trios
Musical groups from New Jersey
Musical groups established in 1992
Musical groups disestablished in 2001
1992 establishments in New Jersey